Cousin Kate may refer to:
 Cousin Kate (novel), a 1968 novel by Georgette Heyer
 Cousin Kate (play), a 1910 play by Hubert Henry Davies
 Cousin Kate (film), a lost 1921 American drama film, based on Davies's play